In quantum foundations, the KCBS pentagram was discovered by Alexander Klyachko, M. Ali Can, Sinem Binicioglu, and Alexander Shumovsky as an example disproving noncontextual hidden variable models.

Let's say we have a pentagram, which is a graph with 5 vertices and 5 edges. Each vertex can be colored either red or blue. An edge is said to match if both of its vertices have the same color. Otherwise, it's a mismatch. In a hidden variable model, the total number of mismatches over all of the edges has to be an even number due to cyclicity, i.e. 0, 2 or 4. So, with a probability mixture over hidden variable assignments, the expectation value of the sum of mismatches over all of the 5 edges has to lie between 0 and 4.

Then, someone hands you a huge number of KCBS pentagrams, but at first, all of the colorings are hidden. You're told you can only uncover 2 vertices at most, and only if they share a common edge. So, for each pentagram, you randomly pick an edge and uncover the colors on its vertices. This random choice is necessary because if the pentagram producers had been able to guess your choice for each pentagram in advance, he could have "conspired" to fool you.

How was it done? Each pentagram is a 3D quantum system with an orthonormal basis .
Adjacent projectors commute. If we project, color the vertex red. Otherwise, color it blue.

See also
 Mermin–Peres square

Quantum mechanics
Interpretations of quantum mechanics